Steven Lamont Hall (born April 15, 1973) is a former American football cornerback who played one season in the NFL for the Indianapolis Colts and the Minnesota Vikings. He went to college at Kentucky.

References

External links
Steve Hall Stats, News and Video - DB

Minnesota Vikings players
Indianapolis Colts players
Living people
1973 births
Players of American football from Indiana
American football cornerbacks
Kentucky Wildcats football players